Edward Dixon Parsons (May 12, 1916 – October 31, 1991) was a Major League Baseball player. He batted and threw right-handed.

He was born in Talladega, Alabama and died in Longview, Texas.

External links

1916 births
1991 deaths
Major League Baseball catchers
Detroit Tigers players
Baseball players from Alabama
People from Talladega, Alabama